Vidyagauri Adkar is a Kathak dance exponent in India representing the Jaipur gharana . She has performed in many music festivals including Khajuraho Festival of Dances, Chilanka Dance Festival in Thiruvananthapuram, Festival of Dance and Music, Delhi etc.

Career
Adkar started her dance training initially in Borivali, Mumbai, and Pune during her school and college education.  She moved to Delhi for higher studies. She has performed in many parts of India and also in South Africa.

Music festivals
 Khajuraho Festival of Dances, Khajuraho
 Kathak Prabha – Festival of India in South Africa  
 2012 Kathak Mahotsava, Delhi
World Dance Day celebration, New Delhi

See also
 List of Kathak exponents
 List of Kathak dancers

External links
 Kathak Dance Vidyagauri Adkar, Dhrupad Ashish Sankrityayan, Dalchand Sharma
 Kathak Dance With Dhrupad Vidyagauri Adkar Ashish Sankrityayan Khajuraho Festival 2014
 Nilakshi kathak duet with Vidyagauri Adkar
 Vidyagauri Adkar, Mahati Kanna, and Bithika Mistry's dance at Khajuraho Festival of Dances
 Kathak | Vidya Gowri and Muzafer | Thirunagai Natyanjali Festival 2016

References

Kathak exponents
Artists from Pune
Indian dance teachers
20th-century Indian dancers
Indian female classical dancers
Performers of Indian classical dance
Dancers from Maharashtra
Living people
Women artists from Maharashtra
20th-century Indian women artists
Year of birth missing (living people)